Rakas v. Illinois, 439 U.S. 128 (1978), was a decision by the United States Supreme Court, in which the Court held that the "legitimately on the property" requirement of Jones v. United States, for challenging the legality of a police search, was too broad. The majority opinion by then-Associate Justice Rehnquist held that a defendant needs to show a "legitimate" expectation of privacy in the place searched in order to be eligible to challenge the search. For example, an overnight guest in a friend's apartment has such "standing". 

In the case at issue, the Court ruled that vehicular passengers in a car they did not own had no such legitimate expectation.

Subsequent History 
In Rawlings v. Kentucky (1980), the Court ruled that the test enunciated in Rakas—whether the petitioner had a reasonable expectation of privacy in the area searched—is the exclusive test for determining whether a defendant has standing to challenge a search.

External links
 

United States Fourth Amendment case law
United States Supreme Court cases
United States Supreme Court cases of the Burger Court
1978 in United States case law